Anaïs Caradeux (born 30 June 1990) is a French freestyle skier. She won a silver medal at the 2013 FIS Freestyle World Ski Championships.

References

External links
 FIS-Ski.com Profile

Living people
French female freestyle skiers
1990 births
Freestyle skiers at the 2014 Winter Olympics
Freestyle skiers at the 2018 Winter Olympics
Olympic freestyle skiers of France
Université Savoie-Mont Blanc alumni
People from Aix-les-Bains
Sportspeople from Savoie